Doug Keil is an American para-alpine skier. He represented the United States at the 1980 Winter Paralympics and he won two gold medals: one in the Men's Giant Slalom 4 event and one in the Men's Slalom 4 event. In both events he was the only competitor. Both his left arm and leg were amputated after being electrocuted at age 14.

Achievements

See also 
 List of Paralympic medalists in alpine skiing

References 

Living people
Year of birth missing (living people)
Place of birth missing (living people)
Paralympic alpine skiers of the United States
American male alpine skiers
American amputees
Alpine skiers at the 1980 Winter Paralympics
Medalists at the 1980 Winter Paralympics
Paralympic gold medalists for the United States
Paralympic medalists in alpine skiing